Martín Miguel Cortes  (born 7 January 1983 in Punta Alta) is an Argentine-born Chilean footballer, who plays for Curicó Unido.

External links
 Profile at Defe.com.ar 
 2004-05 Statistics at Sport.be 

1983 births
Living people
Argentine footballers
Argentine expatriate footballers
Association football midfielders
R.A.E.C. Mons players
Defensores de Belgrano footballers
Paysandu Sport Club players
Ñublense footballers
Curicó Unido footballers
Chilean Primera División players
Primera B de Chile players
Sportspeople from Buenos Aires Province
Expatriate footballers in Belgium
Expatriate footballers in Brazil
Expatriate footballers in Chile
Naturalized citizens of Chile